Régine Detambel is a French writer. She was born in 1963. She published her first book in 1990, and has written prolifically ever since. Her works have been published primarily by Julliard, Le Seuil and Gallimard. She has won the Prix Anna de Noailles, the Alain Fournier Prize, and the Chevalier des Arts et des Lettres.

Works

Fiction
 L’Amputation, Julliard, 1990
 L’Orchestre et la Semeuse, Julliard, 1990
 La Modéliste, Julliard, 1990
 Le Long Séjour, Julliard, 1991
 La Quatrième Orange, Julliard, 1992
 Le Vélin, Julliard, 1993
 La Lune dans le rectangle du patio, Gallimard « Haute Enfance », 1994
 Le Jardin clos, Gallimard « Blanche », 1994
 Le Ventilateur, Gallimard « Blanche », 1995
 La Verrière, Gallimard « Folio » no 3107, 1996
 Elle ferait battre les montagnes, Gallimard « Blanche », 1997
 La Patience sauvage, Gallimard « Blanche », 1999
 La Chambre d’écho, Le Seuil « Points » no 1062, 2001
 Mésanges, Gallimard « Blanche », 2003
 Pandémonium, Gallimard « Blanche », 2006
 Notre-Dame des Sept Douleurs, Gallimard « Haute Enfance », 2008
 Noces de chêne, Gallimard « Blanche », 2008
 Sur l’aile, Mercure de France, 2010
 50 histoires fraîches, Gallimard « Blanche », 2010
 Son corps extrême, Actes Sud, 2011
 Opéra sérieux, Actes Sud, 2012
 Martin le Bouillant, publie.net, 2013
 La Splendeur, Actes Sud, 2014
 Le Chaste Monde, Actes Sud, 2014
 Trois ex, Actes Sud, janvier 2017

Formes brèves
 Les Écarts majeurs, Julliard, 1993
 Album, Calmann-Lévy, coll. « Petite Bibliothèque Européenne du XXe siècle », 1995
 Icônes, Poésie, Champ Vallon, 1996
 Brèves histoires d’humour, 6 petits livres choisis et préfacés par R. Detambel, Mercure de France, 1997
 La Ligne âpre, Christian Bourgois Éditeur, 1998
 Blasons d’un corps enfantin, Fata Morgana, 2000
 Graveurs d’enfance, Christian Bourgois Éditeur ; rééd. « Folio », no 3637, 2002
 Emulsions, Poésie, Champ Vallon, 2003
 Les enfants se défont par l’oreille, Fata Morgana, 2006
 Le Musée Fabre par quatre chemins, Éditions Méridianes, février 2011
 Blasons d’un corps masculin (Reprint), Publie.papier, publie.net, coll. Reprint, juillet 2012
 Le Grand Élucidaire des choses de l’amour, linogravures de Bernard Alligand, Æncrages & Co, février 2014

Essays
 Colette. Comme une flore, comme un zoo, Stock, 1997
 L’Écrivaillon ou l’Enfance de l’écriture, Gallimard / « Haute Enfance », 1997
 Bernard Noël, poète épithélial, Jean-Michel Place / Poésie, 2007
 Petit éloge de la peau, Gallimard / "Folio 2 €" (n° 4482), 2007
 Le Syndrome de Diogène, éloge des vieillesses, Actes Sud, 2008
 Les livres prennent soin de nous. Pour une bibliothérapie créative, Actes Sud, 2015

For younger readers
 La Comédie des mots, Gallimard, coll. « Page blanche », 1997 ; rééd. Gallimard Jeunesse Hors Série Littérature, 2004
 Les Contes d’Apothicaire, Gallimard / « La Bibliothèque Gallimard » n°2, 1998
 La Nouvelle Comédie des mots, Gallimard, coll. « Page blanche », 1999
 Des petits riens au goût de citron, Éditions Thierry Magnier Nouvelles, 2008
 Graveurs d'enfance, Christian Bourgois Editeur / « Folio » n°3637, 2002
 La tête au ciel, Éditions Thierry Magnier Roman, 2013
 La Boîte à lettres de Souriceau, texte Régine Detambel, illustrations de Beatrice Alemagna, Hachette jeunesse, 1999

References

French women writers
French writers
1963 births
Living people